Ilmin International Relations Institute (IIRI) is a research institute at Korea University in Seoul, South Korea. Founded in April 1995, IIRI was named after Sang-man Kim, Korea University’s former chairman of the board of trustees. In 1995, Dr. Sung-joo Han was appointed as the first director.

The Institute's first edition of the Journal of International Politics was published in March 1996.

Research projects
 Five-Islands Project
 Korean Strategic Thoughts toward Asia
 US-Korea Alliance and the Future of Northeast Asia (Co-organizer : KEIO Institute of East Asian Studies)
 US-Korea Alliance and the Future of Northeast Asia (Co-organizer : SAIS)
 Globalization, Pluralism, and Securitization in East Asia
 Environmental Security in East Asia

External links
 Institute website

Institutes of Korea University
Research institutes of international relations